Ghiazi (also Romanized as Ghīāẕī and Gheyāẕī) is a village in Naseri Rural District, Khanafereh District, Shadegan County, Khuzestan Province, Iran. At the 2006 census, its population was 425, in 68 families.

References 

Populated places in Shadegan County